Miryalaguda Assembly constituency is a constituency of the Telangana Legislative Assembly, India. It is one of 12 constituencies in the Nalgonda district. It is part of Nalgonda Lok Sabha constituency.

As of 2018, N Bhaskar Rao, of Telangana Rashtra Samithi, represents the constituency.

Mandals
The Assembly Constituency presently comprises the following Mandals:

Members of Legislative Assembly

Election results

2018

2014

2009

See also
 List of constituencies of Telangana Legislative Assembly
 Miryalaguda

References

Assembly constituencies of Telangana
Assembly constituencies of Nalgonda district